Oslo Police District (Norwegian: Oslo politidistrikt) is the largest police district in Norway. The Police District of Asker og Bærum and Oslo Police District are from January 1, 2016 merged into one, Police Districts Asker and Bærum and Oslo are from 1 January 2016 merged into one, and kept the name Oslo Police District. The police district comprises three municipalities, Oslo, Asker and Bærum. It has a total population of around 800,000 people.  
Oslo Police District has seven police stations in charge of policing duties, including assignments in terms of order, prevention and investigation purposes in the surrounding areas.
 
The Police Authority also has special sections for the investigation of serious crime. The investigation led formally by police lawyers, belonging to prosecutors.
 
Serious drug cases and robbery cases are investigated by the Section for organized crime, homicide cases and cases involving sexual crimes investigated by the Division of Violence and sexual crimes, while serious forms of economic crime investigation by the Financial and Environmental Crime Section.  Traffic and sea buffet includes Trafikkorpset and Harbor Police and a specialist on criminal offenses related to the capital's traffic by land and sea. The Police is headquartered at Grønlandsleiret 44 at Grønland in Oslo.

Police stations 
Western unit
 Asker police station, located in Torvveien 20, Asker
 Bærum police station, located in Kjørboveien 33, Sandvika (Bærum)
 Majorstuen police station, located in Sørkedalsveien 27 B at Majorstuen

Unit of central Oslo
 Grønland police station, located in the Oslo Police Headquarters at Grønlandsleiret 44, Grønland.
 Sentrum police station, Hammersborggata 12, next door to National Police Directorate (Norway) in central Oslo.
 There is also a smaller police office, located at the Oslo Central Station.

Eastern unit
 Manglerud police station, located in Plogveien 31 at Manglerud.
 Stovner police station, located in Aasta Hansteens vei 10 at Stovner.

Contact 
Emergency telephone number is ☎ 112, non emergency calls at ☎ 02800 or ☎ (+47)22 66 90 50.

Common units 
Police Section for Immigration Administration
Common unit for operational service
Common criminal unit
Common unit for intelligence and investigation
Common unit for prevention
Common unit for prosecution
Common unit for foreigners and administration
Joint unit for civil justice (namsfogd)
Common unit for national aid resources

Mobility 
Oslo Police disposal units that move on land (mounted police in addition to patrols on foot, by car and motorcycle), sea (Harbor Police) and by air (helicopter).

Gallery

See also 
 Police Services at Oslo Airport, Gardermoen
 Norwegian Police Service
 National Criminal Investigation Service (Norway)
 National Police Immigration Service (Norway)
 List of police districts in Norway

References

External links 
 Contact information in English

Police districts in Norway
Organisations based in Oslo
Law enforcement agencies of Norway